Geoffrey Heath Wedgwood, ARCA, RE  (6 April 1900 – June 1977) was a British etcher and engraver, best known for his architectural etchings.

Early life and education
Born in Leek, Staffordshire, the son of Jane and Frank Wedgwood, an engineer, but brought up in Liverpool, Wedgwood attended the Liverpool Institute and then served with the British Army in the First World War. From 1919 to 1921 he studied at the Liverpool City School of Art Winning a scholarship to the Royal College of Art, London, he studied engraving there under Sir Frank Short and from 1924 under his successor Malcolm Osborne.

He was a Rome scholar at the British School at Rome, having won the Engraving Prize in 1925, the same year that Edward Irvine Halliday (1902–1984), a fellow Liverpudlian and also a former student at the RCA, won the Painting Prize. According to Edward Morris, writing in the Connoisseur, Wedgwood "reverted to architectural subjects; his line became harder and more precise; his effects clearer and sharper; less of his work was etched, more engraved; some of the credit for these effects must go to the printer, David Strang".

"In Wedgwood's architectural etchings", wrote Guichard, "the severity of the formal harmonies of square and rectangle in the roofs and walls of old buildings is relieved by gentle caricature in the small local figures that inhabit the scenes and are sympathetically observed."

Career
He later taught at the Liverpool Institute from 1932 to 1935 and at the Liverpool City School of Art from 1935 until his retirement in 1960.

He also worked as an illustrator. His etchings for menus were shown at the L.N.E.R. exhibition of poster art at Burlington Galleries in 1933.
Among various projects for Martins Bank advertising in the early 1950s, he was commissioned together with J. C. Armitage (Ionicus) and F. G. Lodge, to do drawings of English stately homes.

Published works
Not complete
 Roberts, Gruffydd Dewi (1935), The House that was forgotten, illus. by Geoffrey Wedgwood. London: Lovat Dickson & Thompson Limited 
 Roberts, Gruffydd Dewi (1937), Heron's Island, illus. by Geoffrey Wedgwood. London: Dent

Awards and honours
 Winner of the Engraving Prize (1925) to be a scholar at the British School at Rome with two works: Negro Dentist and St Pancras Washhouse 
 Elected an associate of the Royal Society of Painter-Etchers and Engravers in 1925 and a fellow in 1934.
 Elected associate member of the Royal Cambrian Academy in 1942 and a full member in 1943. Wedgwood resigned his membership in 1958.

Exhibitions
 Junior Workers' Guild exhibition, Mansard Gallery, London, 1925
 Art Institute of Chicago: "International Exhibition of Contemporary Prints: A Century of Progress" 1 June to 1 November 1934: Outside the Walls engraving by Geoffrey Wedgwood exhibited (no. 136)
 Sandon Music Room, Bluecoat Chambers, School Lane, Liverpool, 1944: "Pictures by Four Artists: N. Martin Bell; Edgar Grosvenor; Charles W. Sharpe; Geoffrey H. Wedgwood"
 Contemporary British Prints and Drawings from the Wakefield Collection British Council touring exhibition, 1947–1950. An exhibition of prints and drawings from the Wakefield Collection selected by James Laver
 Royal Academy (for example The Borghese Gardens, Rome, exhibited in the summer of 1929)
 New English Art Club
 Fine Art Society, New Bond Street, London
 Walker Art Gallery, Liverpool: "Geoffrey Heath Wedgwood", 2 February – 4 March 1972

Works in public collections
 Art Institute of Chicago, Chicago: Old Aldgate, n.d.
 British Museum, London: Porta Capriana, Naples, 1931 (image not shown online)
 British Council Collection: St Peter's, Genoa, line engraving, 1927, accession no. P2479
 Davison Art Center, Wesleyan University, Middletown, CT: Old Aldgate, drypoint, 1924, accession no. 1937.D1.41
 Mildred Lane Kemper Art Museum, Washington University in St. Louis: S.S. Giovanni e Paolo, Rome, 1926, accession no. WU 3719 
 Legion of Honor, Fine Arts Museums of San Francisco: Works by Geoffrey Heath Wedgwood
 Minneapolis Institute of Art, Minneapolis: Pincian Gardens, Rome, 1930
 Museum of Fine Arts, Houston: Borghese Gardens, Rome, 1928,  and The Fishmarket, Naples, 1929 (both etching and drypoint)
 National Gallery of Victoria, Melbourne: The fishmarket, Naples, 1929, drypoint; Street scene, 1931, drypoint; 
 University Art Gallery, Pittsburgh: The Capitol, Rome, accession no. 72.1.16
 University of Liverpool: several items
 Victoria and Albert Museum: St Peter's, Genoa, accession no. E.859-1959

References

Further reading
 Guichard, Kenneth M. (1977, 2nd ed. 1981), British Etchers 1850–1940. London: Robin Garton  
 Hopkinson, Martin (1999). No Day without a Line.  The History of the Royal Society of Painter-Printmakers, 1880–1999.  Oxford: Ashmolean Museum hardback  paperback 
Laver, J. "The Etchings of Geoffrey Heath Wedgwood", Bookman's Journal, XII, p. 231, 1925
 Morris, Edward (1972), Geoffrey Heath Wedgwood (exh. cat., Walker Art Gallery, 2 February – 4 March 1972). Liverpool: National Museums & Galleries on Merseyside  
 University of Liverpool (1977): The work of Geoffrey Heath Wedgwood from the collection of the University of Liverpool (exh. cat. with introduction by Andrew W. Moore). Liverpool: University of Liverpool   and 

1900 births
1977 deaths
People from Leek, Staffordshire
Alumni of Liverpool College of Art
Alumni of the Royal College of Art
Academics of Liverpool College of Art
English engravers
English etchers
English printmakers
20th-century engravers